Jahm bin Safwan was an Islamic theologian who attached himself to Al-Harith ibn Surayj, a dissident in Khurasan towards the end of the Umayyad period, and who was put to death in 745 by Salm ibn Ahwaz.

Biography
Jahm was a client of the Banu Rāseb tribe. He was born in Kufa, but settled down in Khurāsān in Tirmidh. He learned under al-Ja'd b. Dirham. al-Ja'd b. Dirham was a teacher of the last Umayyad caliph, Marwan II, and is described as a Dahrī and Zindīq. He was the first Muslim reported to have spoken about the createdness of the Qurʾān and reject Abraham's friendship with God and Moses' speaking to Him. The name of Jahm b. Ṣafwān would later be ascribed - possibly spuriously - to the theological movement known as the Jahmiyya (see: Jahmites).

Jahm worked as the assistant to Al-Harith ibn Surayj during the latter's revolt against the Umayyad governor Nasr ibn Sayyar. Jahm was killed during the first attempt to take Merv in 746, though the revolt greatly weakened Umayyad power and indirectly contributed to the success of the Abbasid Revolution.

Teachings

Establishing the positive content of Jahm's doctrines is difficult, as they are reproduced (in an abbreviated form) only in later polemical works that are impossible to verify. However, it is said that he taught that only a few attributes can be predicated to God, such as creation, divine power and action, whilst others such as speech cannot. Therefore, he believed that it was wrong to talk about the eternal word of the Qur'an, since God (according to Jahm) is not a speaker in the first place.

Jahm was a proponent of extreme determinism, according to which a man acts only metaphorically in the same way in which the sun is said to set: according to Jahm, this is a linguistic convention rather than an accurate description, as it is actually God that makes the sun set.

Legacy

Jahm's doctrines about God and His attributes were taken up in criticisms of the Mu'tazila, who were sometimes called Jahmites by their adversaries. The Mu'tazila believed that the Qur'ān was created, a tenet which agreed with Jahm's recorded view.

Jahm left no writings, but many Muslim scholars wrote about his doctrines and a few modern scholars have written studies of him.

Criticism

Contemporary to Him
Muqatil ibn Sulayman, an early commentator on the Qur'an who Sunni Muslims view as the polar opposite of Jahm who went to the other extreme, was a contemporary of Jahm who was particularly critical of him. Between the two men, a heated theological and political debate took place in the mosque of Marw regarding the divine attributes and also two political figures that both men were affiliated with. Each of them ended up writing a book refuting the other, and Muqatil used his political links to get Jahm expelled from Balkh, having him sent to Termez. Muqatil set up a rival movement to the Jahmiyyah known as the Muqatiliyyah, and Sunni Muslims have identified themselves as being between what they view as two extremes (negation and likening of the divine attributes, Ta'til and Tasbih). Muqatil himself was condemned by scholars of his time like Abu Hanifah and Makki Ibn Ibrahim (the teacher of al-Bukhari).

Abu Hanifah (d. 150 H) also harshly criticised Jahm and this was alongside his criticism of the opposing Muqatiliyyah. In particular Abu Hanifah went as far as declaring Jahm a disbeliever.

Later Scholars
A theologian by the name of Uthman bin Sa'id ad-Darimi (d. 280 H) (not to be confused with Al-Darimi the author of the Sunnan) also wrote refutations of Jahm and wrote a large refutation of a prominent Jahmite by the name of Bishr ibn Ghiyāth al-Mārisî wherein he declared him a Kafir (a disbeliever). Like Muqatil, Uthman bin Sa'id himself received criticism and there have been scholars who have criticised him as going to the opposite extreme to Jahm, being a Mujassim (anthropomorphist). In particular the Sunni Hadith scholar and ascetic Al-Hakim al-Tirmidhi (d. ~280 H) wrote a response to him.

Many Hadith scholars wrote refutations of Jahm bin Ṣafwān's doctrines, particularly the Sunni Hadith scholar Ahmad ibn Hanbal (d. 241 H) and his students like al-Bukhari (d. 256 H) and Abu Dawud as-Sijistani (d. 275 H). Al-Bukhari adopted the teachings of the traditionalist and scholar of Kalam Ibn Kullab alongside al-Karabisi in matters of creed, who also repudiated the Jahmiyyah. Then later Sunni Kalam theologians continued to criticise him, in particular Abu Hasan al-Ash'ari (d. 324 H) and Abu Mansur al-Maturidi (d. 333 H), and he continued to be mentioned in later Ash'ari and Maturidi heresiology works.

See also
 Muqatil ibn Sulayman
 Jahmi
 Jabriyah

References

Islamic philosophers
People from Kufa
746 deaths
Khurasan under the Umayyad Caliphate
8th-century Muslim scholars of Islam